Donald Nzé (born 5 May 1992) is a Gabonese international footballer who plays for AS Pélican as a goalkeeper.

Career
He has played club football for AS Pélican.

He made his international debut for Gabon in 2017.

References

1992 births
Living people
Gabonese footballers
Gabon international footballers
AS Pélican players
Association football goalkeepers
21st-century Gabonese people